Butler Township is an inactive township in Pemiscot County, in the U.S. state of Missouri.

Butler Township has the name of F. C. Butler, a local law enforcement agent.

References

Townships in Missouri
Townships in Pemiscot County, Missouri